Woman is the fifth studio album by American singer Jill Scott. It was released on July 24, 2015, through Blues Babe Records and Atlantic Records.

Commercial performance

The album debuted at number one on the US Billboard 200 chart, with first-week sales of 58,000 copies in the United States.

Track listing

Samples
Credits adapted from liner notes.

 "Lighthouse" contains a sample of "Ready Set Loop", as performed by SBTRKT
 "Fool's Gold" contains a sample of "Evening Star", as performed by Yutaka Yokokura
 "Closure" contains a sample of "Get Down", as performed by Curtis Mayfield and "The Jam", as performed by Graham Central Station

Charts

Weekly charts

Year-end charts

References

External links 
 

2015 albums
Albums produced by Dre & Vidal
Jill Scott (singer) albums